Sérgio Silva do Amaral (born 1 June 1944 in São Paulo) is a Brazilian attorney, diplomat, college professor and politician.

He was Minister of Development, Industry and Foreign Trade of Brazil, from 1 August 2001 to 1 January 2003, during President Fernando Henrique Cardoso government.

Amaral served as Brazilian Ambassador to the United States between 2016 and 2019.

References

External links

|-

1944 births
Living people
Government ministers of Brazil
Brazilian diplomats
Ambassadors of Brazil to the United States
Honorary Knights Commander of the Order of the British Empire